United Nations Security Council Resolution 153, adopted unanimously on August 23, 1960, after examining the application of the Gabon Republic for membership in the United Nations the Council recommended to the General Assembly that the Gabon Republic be admitted.

See also
List of United Nations Security Council Resolutions 101 to 200 (1953–1965)

References
Text of the Resolution at undocs.org

External links
 

 0153
History of Gabon 
1960 in Gabon 
Foreign relations of Gabon
 0153
 0153
August 1960 events